Guanzhuang Area is an area and township located on the eastern side of Chaoyang District, Beijing, China. It sits south of Changying Township, west of Beiyuan Subdistrict and Yongshun Town, north of Heizhuanghu and Dougezhuang Townships, and east of Sanjianfang Township. As of 2021, the area had a population of 93,273.

The name Guanzhuang is from a local village bearing the same name.

History

Administrative Divisions 
In 2021, Guangzhuang is divided into 26 subdivisions, with 14 communities and 12 villages:

See also 
 List of township-level divisions of Beijing

References

Chaoyang District, Beijing
Areas of Beijing